"Wheel of Fortune" is a song by Swedish pop group Ace of Base, released as their first single from the debut album, Happy Nation (1992). It was first serviced to Danish radio in early 1992, through Mega Records, but failed to pick up much support. When re-promoted for a third time and released in stores on 29 June 1992, it entered the official Danish singles chart at number six, before later peaking at number two. It wasn't released elsewhere in Europe until 1993, following the success of their second single, "All That She Wants".

"Wheel of Fortune" is a reggae flavoured dance-pop song written by Jonas Berggren and Ulf Ekberg. It was recorded in Studio Decibel in Stockholm, Sweden for a budget of SEK 30,000, and did not enter the charts when it was released for the first time. It was the third re-release of the single that entered the charts after radio stations and clubs started to play it. The song peaked at number-one in Norway, and was a top 10 hit in Austria, Belgium, Denmark, Germany, Israel, the Netherlands, Spain and Switzerland.

Critical reception 
AllMusic editor Jose F. Promis complimented the song as "stellar". In an retrospective review, Nikola Nedeljkovic Gøttsche from Danish newspaper Dagbladet Information remarked "its immediate melodic pop appeal and the combination of dancefloor pop and the fashionable warm reggae". Swedish Göteborgsposten described it as a "dance-song with some "Bad Boys" (Inner Circle) and Dr. Alban rhythms, but with more pop direction." The reviewer complimented Linn Berggren's voice, adding that it "makes me think of Angel for a while". Andrew Balkin from Kingston Informer wrote that "the Aces go downbeat" on "Wheel of Fortune" and "Happy Nation", stating that both songs "have a soul/dance feel about them and wouldn't be out of place on the dance floor, or setting the mood in a smoky club." Liverpool Echo felt it is "cannily close" to "All That She Wants", with "its reggae-ish beat and just as catchy." 

James Masterton viewed it as "poppy dub-reggae" in his weekly UK chart commentary. Pan-European magazine Music & Media described it as "oriental-tinged". Alan Jones from Music Week rated the single four out of five, writing that the group "return with another subdued reggae singalong that also suggests Opus's "Live Is Life" hit. Fewer of the commercially-pleasing devices that exemplified "All That She Wants" mean it will be a smaller hit though another Top 10 placing seems likely." James Hamilton from the RM Dance Update deemed it "another Boney M-ish inane non sequiturs filled Swedish pop lurcher". Chuck Campbell from Scripps Howard News Service called it a "reggae-paced" number.

Chart performance 
The single entered the Danish charts at number six on the chart dated 10 July 1992. It would go on to peak at number two in October, with the follow-up single "All That She Wants" overtaking it at number one. In the United Kingdom, "Wheel of Fortune" was released as the second single and it reached number 20 in its second week at the UK Singles Chart, on 29 August 1993. It was a number one hit in Norway, and a number two hit in Denmark, Israel and the Netherlands. Additionally, the song made its way into the top 10 also in Austria, Belgium, Germany, Spain and Switzerland, while it peaked within the top 20 in Finland, Iceland and Ireland. On the Eurochart Hot 100, "Wheel of Fortune" reached the top 5, peaking at number five. It earned a gold record in Germany, with a sale of 250,000 singles.

Prior to the official release of the song, a live version of the song entered the charts at number two in Brazilian radio station Emboabas FM on 3 December 2007. The song entered the Radio Aachen chart in Germany at number 26 on 15 December 2007. It also entered the Euro WebCharts at number five in the last week of 2007 and eventually reached number one.

Music video

1992 version 
The original version's music video was directed by Viking Nielson and features all four original members. In a 2018 interview, Ulf Ekberg said that they had $1000 to shoot the video.

It begins with Linn singing. A woman is sitting in a chair on the middle of what appears to be a wheel of fortune. Then several other characters appear along the video. Like a boxing blonde, a little girl playing with an hourglass, a bride in a wedding dress, an angel playing with a golden ball and an older couple. Sometimes the woman in the chair also appears with a man or with the older couple. In between, we see the four members of Ace of Base performing standing together in a circle with their backs against each other. Linn sometimes sings in the chair on the wheel. Other times she appears with Jenny. Joker and Buddha are seen playing on different instruments, such as keyboard, drum, and trumpet. Occasionally, a clock turns in the background.

The video was later published on Ace of Base's official YouTube channel in October 2010. It had generated more than 33 million views as of December 2022.

2009 version 
The 2009 re-recording was the first and only single released by the band as a trio. For this version, the label decided not to shoot a video for the song. However, a promo video was published on 21 October 2008 on the band's official website. Similar to their 1998 single "Always Have Always Will", the video completely consists of live footage from their Redefined tour and video footage from a photoshoot. The edit used in the video is a combination of the radio and album versions, lasting at 3:15 minutes.

Track listings

Original release 
 7-inch single
 "Wheel of Fortune" — 3:42
 "Wheel of Fortune" (Club Mix) — 4:39

 CD single, The Nordics
 "Wheel of Fortune"

 CD maxi, UK
 "Wheel of Fortune" (7" Mix) — 3:42
 "Wheel of Fortune" (12" Mix) — 5:27
 "Wheel of Fortune" (Club Mix) — 4:39
 "My Mind" (Dance Mix) — 4:19

2009 version 
 Digital single
 "Wheel of Fortune 2009" (Radio Edit)
 "Wheel of Fortune 2009" (Club Mix)

 CD single - Promo
 "Wheel of Fortune 2009" (Radio Edit)
 "Wheel of Fortune 2009" (Club Mix)
 "Wheel of Fortune 2009" (Album Version)
 "Wheel of Fortune" (1993 12" Mix)
 "Wheel of Fortune" (1993 Club Mix)

Personnel 
 Vocals by Linn Berggren 
 Written by Jonas Berggren and Ulf Ekberg
 Produced by Jonas Berggren and Ulf Ekberg, T.O.E.C.
 Recorded at Studios Decibel

Release history

Charts

Weekly charts

Year-end charts

Certifications

References

External links 

1991 songs
1992 debut singles
2008 singles
Ace of Base songs
English-language Swedish songs
Eurodance songs
Mega Records singles
Number-one singles in Norway
Reggae fusion songs
Songs written by Jonas Berggren
Songs written by Ulf Ekberg